St. Francis Airport  was located  west of St. Francis, Alberta, Canada.

References

Defunct airports in Alberta